Lai Yiu-fai is a Hong Kong cinematographer.

Awards

References

External links  
 

Year of birth missing (living people)
Living people
Hong Kong cinematographers
Hong Kong people